Simon Petrie is a New Zealand-born speculative fiction writer now based in Canberra, Australia. He is predominantly recognised as a writer in the science fiction and fantasy genres. Petrie's stories have appeared in a number of Australian publications including Borderlands, Aurealis and Andromeda Spaceways Inflight Magazine, in New Zealand publications such as Semaphore Magazine and several Random Static anthologies, and in magazines elsewhere in the English-speaking world such as Redstone Science Fiction, Murky Depths and Sybil's Garage. He is a former member of the Andromeda Spaceways Inflight Magazine collective and has edited five issues of the magazine.

Petrie's work has seen several nominations for Australian and New Zealand speculative fiction awards and he has won the Sir Julius Vogel Award (New Zealand SF Award) three times: in 2010 for Best New Talent, and in 2013 and 2018 for Best Novella or Novelette. He is best known for two series of stories: his 'Gordon Mamon' stories ("Murder on the Zenith Express", "Single Handed", "The Fall Guy", The Hunt For Red Leicester, "A Night To Remember", "Elevator Pitch" and "This Guy's The Limit") centred around the exploits of a space-elevator operative who doubles as a reluctant detective and his 'Titan' stories (Wide Brown Land, a collection of eleven short stories, and the novella Matters Arising from the Identification of the Body) exploring human colonization of the Saturnian satellite.

Bibliography
Collected short fiction 
 Rare Unsigned Copy: tales of Rocketry, Ineptitude, and Giant Mutant Vegetables (2010, Peggy Bright Books)
 Difficult Second Album: more stories of Xenobiology, Space Elevators, and Bats Out Of Hell (2014, Peggy Bright Books)
 Wide Brown Land: stories of Titan (2018, Peggy Bright Books)
 80,000 Totally Secure Passwords That No Hacker Would Ever Guess (2018)
 Murder on the Zenith Express: the Gordon Mamon collection (2018)

Novellas
 Flight 404/The Hunt for Red Leicester (2012, Peggy Bright Books)
 Matters Arising from the Identification of the Body (2017, Peggy Bright Books)

Anthologies—as editor or coeditor
 Andromeda Spaceways Inflight Magazine issues 35, 40, 51, 54, 61 (2008–2015, Andromeda Spaceways Publishing Co-operative)
 Light Touch Paper, Stand Clear (2012, Peggy Bright Books, coeditor with Edwina Harvey)
 Next (2013, CSFG Publishing, coeditor with Robert Porteous)
 Use Only As Directed (2014, Peggy Bright Books, coeditor with Edwina Harvey)

Awards and nominations
In the following table, entries with a blue background won the award; those with a white background were the nominees on the short-list.

 Award winner
 Nominee on the shortlist

References

Living people
New Zealand fantasy writers
New Zealand science fiction writers
New Zealand male short story writers
Australian science fiction writers
Year of birth missing (living people)